Býkov-Láryšov is a municipality in Bruntál District in the Moravian-Silesian Region of the Czech Republic. It has about 200 inhabitants.

Administrative parts
The municipality is made up of villages of Býkov and Láryšov.

Notable people
Alfred Proksch (1891–1981), Austrian Nazi politician

Gallery

References

External links

 

Villages in Bruntál District